Tunesmith: The Songs of Jimmy Webb is a compilation album of songs written by Jimmy Webb and performed by various artists. Released in November 2003 by Raven Records, this two-disc compilation covers most of Webb's songwriting career, including some of his earliest recordings from the 1960s.

Packaging
The two-disc compilation contains an insert with liner notes written by Glenn A. Baker.

Track listing
Disc 1

"Love Years Coming" by Strawberry Children – 2:47
"I Keep On Keeping On" by the Contessas – 2:27
"Worst That Could Happen" by Brooklyn Bridge – 3:05
"How Sweet It Is" by The Picardy Singers – 2:36
"Up, Up and Away" by 5th Dimension – 2:37
"The Girls' Song" by Jackie DeShannon – 1:49
"Tunesmith" by Vicki Carr – 3:07
"Requiem: 820 Latham" by The Executives – 3:08
"Magic Garden" by Dusty Springfield – 2:24
"Galveston" by Glen Campbell – 2:38
"Just Another Piece of Paper" by Glen Campbell – 2:08
"Macarthur Park" by Richard Harris – 7:24
"If Ships Were Made to Sail" by Scott Walker – 2:36
"Where Does Brown Begin?" by Scott Walker – 4:34
"Song Seller" by Paul Revere & The Raiders – 3:32
"Clowns Exit Laughing" by The Fortunes – 3:11
"When It Was Done" by Hugo Montenegro – 3:43
"She Never Smiles Anymore" by The Mike Perjanik Complex – 3:09
"Do What You Gotta Do" by Four Tops – 4:02
"Honey Come Back" by Junior Walker & the All Stars – 4:19
"By the Time I Get to Phoenix" by Stevie Wonder – 4:21
"My Christmas Tree" by Temptations – 3:18
"Didn't We" by Dionne Warwick – 2:47
"Mixed-Up Girl" by Nancy Wilson – 2:30

Disc 2

"P.F. Sloan" by The Association – 4:01
"Wichita Lineman"/ "By the Time I Get to Phoenix" by King Harvest (see Leo de Castro) – 4:17
"All My Love's Laughter" by Jennifer Warnes – 3:23
"The Moon's a Harsh Mistress" by Judy Collins – 3:05
"Parenthesis" by Kerry Biddell – 2:51
"The Name of My Sorrow" by Mark Lindsay – 4:37
"The Old Man at the Fair" by Mark Lindsay – 3:37
"Met Her on a Plane" by Ian Matthews – 3:35
"All I Know" by Art Garfunkel – 2:25
"5:30 Plane" by The Supremes – 3:56
"Cheap Lovin'" by The Supremes – 4:19
"Everybody Gets to Go to the Moon" by The Three Degrees – 4:17
"She Moves, Eyes Follow" by Kenny Rankin – 3:59
"Oklahoma Nights" by Arlo Guthrie – 3:23
"Highwayman" by The Highwaymen – 3:02
"Himmler's Ring" by Lowell George – 2:30
"Lost Generation" by Onie J. Holy – 3:19
"The Last Unicorn" by Kenny Loggins – 3:43
"Where's the Playground Susie" by Everything but the Girl – 2:30
"Wichita Lineman" by R.E.M. – 3:15
"You Can't Treat the Wrong Man Right" by Linda Ronstadt – 3:31
"Adios" by Linda Ronstadt – 3:36

Personnel
The following is an alphabetical list of the primary artists represented on this compilation.

 The 5th Dimension
 The Association
 Brooklyn Bridge
 Glen Campbell
 Vikki Carr
 Judy Collins
 Leo de Castro
 Jackie DeShannon
 Everything But the Girl
 The Executives
 Four Tops
 Art Garfunkel

 Lowell George
 Arlo Guthrie
 Richard Harris
 The Highwaymen
 King Harvest
 Mark Lindsay
 Kenny Loggins
 Ian Matthews
 Hugo Montenegro
 R.E.M.
 Kenny Rankin
 Paul Revere & the Raiders

 Linda Ronstadt
 Dusty Springfield
 Strawberry Children
 The Supremes
 The Temptations
 The Three Degrees
 Junior Walker & the All-Stars
 Scott Walker
 Jennifer Warnes
 Dionne Warwick
 Jimmy Webb
 Stevie Wonder

References

2003 compilation albums